Münsterstraße is an underground station of the Dortmund Stadtbahn. It is situated below the crossroads of Münsterstraße and Haydnstraße in Dortmund, Germany. The line U41 serves the station.

History
The tram line to Brambauer originally opened on 14 December 1904. It is the northernmost tunnel station of the line, which returns above ground between Münsterstraße and Lortzingstraße station.

Services
The station is served every 10 minutes during rush hours, every 20 minutes during off-peak hours.

References

Railway stations in Dortmund